Frederick M. Padilla is a retired U.S. Marine major general. Padilla previously served as commanding general of 3rd Marine Division.

Marine Corps career
Padilla was commissioned in the United States Marine Corps as a second lieutenant in 1983 after graduation from East Carolina University. He graduated from The Basic School at Marine Corps Base Quantico. He served with 3rd Battalion, 6th Marines as platoon commander, company commander and battalion adjutant. His next assignment was with 3rd Battalion, 9th Marines as rifle and weapons company commander followed by assignment as inspector-instructor, weapons company, 2nd Battalion, 23rd Marines. He attended the Marine Corps Amphibious Warfare School, Air Command and Staff College and the Armed Forces Staff College. As a lieutenant colonel, Padilla was assigned as commanding officer, 1st Battalion, 5th Marines. Padilla later earned a Master of Arts degree in national security and strategic studies from Naval War College, Newport, Rhode Island. He was selected for promotion to colonel in March 2005.

His staff and command assignments include command adjutant, Marine Aircraft Group 42; commanding officer, Marine detachment, ; G-3 operations officer, 1st Marine Division; commanding officer, School of Infantry-West; and chief of staff, Marine Corps Combat Development Command; plans officer, J3/5 and secretary of the joint staff; and branch chief for the Joint Requirements Oversight Council (J8) on the joint staff in the Pentagon. Padilla was selected for promotion to brigadier general in May 2009. Padilla was assigned as commanding general of Marine Corps Recruit Depot Parris Island and Eastern Recruiting Region, South Carolina. As a major general, Padilla assumed command of 3rd Marine Division from July 1, 2011 to July 12, 2013. His next assignment was as director of operations with plans, policies and operations, Headquarters Marine Corps. Padilla served as 15th president of National Defense University from 2014 to 2017. His final assignment was as the acting director of the Marine Corps Staff at Headquarters Marine Corps in the Pentagon.

In July 2018, Padilla was nominated for promotion to lieutenant general and assignment as commander of Marine Forces Reserve, but his nomination was not approved by the Senate Committee on Armed Services. He retired in 2019.

Awards and decorations

References

Living people
East Carolina University alumni
United States Marine Corps officers
Naval War College alumni
United States Marine Corps personnel of the Iraq War
United States Marine Corps generals
Recipients of the Legion of Merit
1959 births
Presidents of the National Defense University